Morobe Bay is a bay within Huon Gulf, on the coast of Morobe Province, Papua New Guinea.

History 
The American and Australian armed forces used Morobe Bay, also known as "Morobe Harbour", as a safe anchorage and staging point as part of the New Guinea campaign during World War II.

A PT boat advanced base was relocated from Tufi and set up within Morobe Bay by the US Navy, instead of Douglas Harbour near Cape Ward Hunt on 20 April 1943.

References 

 PT boat bases
 Pacific Wreck database

Bays of Papua New Guinea